Karim Azizou (born 20 January 1985 in Périgueux, France) is a Moroccan football (soccer) right back. He currently plays for Maghreb Fez.

Azizou signed a three-year contract with Triestina in summer 2005.

He joined Cremonese of Serie C1 in January 2007. He then left for Lucchese in summer 2007.

External links
 Profile at Lucchese

People from Périgueux
1985 births
Living people
Moroccan footballers
Moroccan expatriate footballers
Serie B players
FC Girondins de Bordeaux players
U.S. Triestina Calcio 1918 players
U.S. Cremonese players
S.S.D. Lucchese 1905 players
Association football fullbacks
French sportspeople of Moroccan descent
Expatriate footballers in Italy
France youth international footballers
Sportspeople from Dordogne
Footballers from Nouvelle-Aquitaine